Peppi is a female Finnish name. Originally it may have been derived from Filippa, but its popularity in the 2000s is explained by Astrid Lindgren's character Pippi Longstocking (Finnish: Peppi Pitkätossu). As of 2015 the name has been given to 2,796 people. The name was added to the almanac in 2010, with a name day on 1 April.

Peppi may also refer to:

People

 Peppi (Gerard van Essen, 1924–1997), of double act Peppi & Kokki on Dutch TV in the 1970s
 Peppi Bruneau (born 1942), politician in Louisiana, USA
 Peppi Azzopardi (born 1959), presenter on Maltese TV
 Josef Heiß (born 1963), German ice hockey goaltender
 Peppi Zellner (born 1975), American football player

Other
 Peppimenarti, Northern Territory, Australia, an aboriginal community

fi:Peppi